Louis Boyer may refer to:

 Louis Boyer (astronomer) (1901–1999), French astronomer
 Louis-Alphonse Boyer (1839–1916), Canadian merchant and political figure from Quebec
 Louis Boyer (merchant) (1795–1870), mason, merchant and land owner
 
Louis Boyer (politician) (1921–2017), French politician

See also
 Louis Bouyer (1913–2004), French Christian minister